Senator Squires may refer:

Carolyn Squires (1940–2016), Montana State Senate
Joel C. Squires (1819–1889), Wisconsin State Senate

See also
Watson C. Squire (1838–1926), U.S. Senator from Washington from 1889 to 1897